Sunday's Children is a 1992 Swedish drama film directed by Daniel Bergman and written by Ingmar Bergman. At the 28th Guldbagge Awards the film won the award for Best Cinematography (Tony Forsberg) and Thommy Berggren was nominated for Best Actor.

Ingmar based his screenplay for Sunday's Children on the life of his father, Church of Sweden minister Erik Bergman. Author Geoffrey MacNab wrote that whereas Ingmar's recollections of Erik are damning in his 1982 film Fanny and Alexander, his 1991–92 study of his father is "far more forgiving" in The Best Intentions and Sunday's Children. Critic Vincent Canby also identified Sunday's Children as "a continuation" of Fanny and Alexander and The Best Intentions.

Cast

Year-end lists
 6th – Peter Rainer, Los Angeles Times
 Top 10 (listed alphabetically, not ranked) – Jimmy Fowler, Dallas Observer
 Top 10 (not ranked) – Howie Movshovitz, The Denver Post

References

External links
 

1992 films
1992 drama films
Swedish drama films
Films with screenplays by Ingmar Bergman
1990s Swedish-language films
1990s Swedish films